This is a list of all present sovereign states in Oceania and their predecessors. The region of Oceania is generally defined geographically to include the subregions of Australasia, Melanesia, Micronesia and Polynesia, and their respective sovereign states. 
Oceania was originally colonised by Europeans with Australia and New Zealand primarily by the British, and the Pacific Islands primarily by the British, French and Dutch. Today, Oceania consists of fourteen sovereign states of various government types, the most common consisting of parliamentary systems.

See also
Federation of Australia
List of sovereign states and dependent territories in Oceania
Succession of states
Timeline of sovereign states in Oceania

References

Oceania-related lists

History of Oceania
Oceania